Belron is a vehicle glass repair and replacement group operating worldwide across 34 countries and employing over 25,000 people. Headquartered in Egham, Surrey, United Kingdom, Belron's brands include Autoglass and Autoglass bodyrepair in the United Kingdom, Republic of Ireland and Poland, Carglass in most of Europe, Safelite in the United States, O'Brien in Australia, Smith & Smith in New Zealand, and Lebeau and Speedy Glass in Canada.

Operations 
Belron brands repair and replace damaged vehicle glass. In many countries, Belron brands are able to repair and replace a customer’s windscreen 24-hours-a-day through branch-based and mobile services.

History 
Belron was first founded as a family business in 1897 as Jacobs & Dandor in Cape Town, South Africa. The company was purchased and renamed Plate Glass Bevelling and Silvering in 1899. In 1917, City Glass Bevelling & Silvering Works bought Plate Glass; the companies were merged in 1919 and went ahead to gain success in the windscreen industry by securing the business rights to the curved windscreen production technology in 1953 and introducing laminated rear windows in 1958.

The company began its international expansion in 1971, starting with the acquisition of O’Brien in Australia. 

International expansion continues with the acquisition of two vehicle glass replacement companies in the UK Autoglass® and Windshields. Consolidated as Autoglass Windshields Limited in 1983.

In 1990, international acquisitions were grouped together under the name Belron. 

2007 Belron acquires US market leader Safelite.

Gary Lubner was named CEO of Belron in 2000; both his father and grandfather had also led the business.

In 2015, Belron (94.85% owned by D'Ieteren) had some 2,400 branches and 10,000 mobile vans, trading under ten major brands including Carglass and Safelite, serving customers in 33 countries. Revenues in 2015 were €3.1 billion

References

External links 

Automotive companies of South Africa
Companies based in Cape Town
Transport companies established in 1897
1897 establishments in the Cape Colony